WKIF may refer to:

 WKIF (FM), a radio station (96.5 FM) in Holly Springs, Mississippi, United States
 WFAV, a radio station (95.1 FM) in Kankakee, Illinois, which held the call sign WKIF from 2012 to 2013
 WVLI, a radio station (92.7 FM) in Kankakee, Illinois, which held the call sign WKIF from 1998 to 2012